Yekta Kurtuluş (born 11 December 1985) is a Turkish professional footballer who plays as a midfielder for Bodrumspor.

Club career
Yekta began his career at İzmirspor playing for the club four years, before signing for Kasımpaşa in 2007, where he was handed the number 5 kit. He made his professional debut on 25 November 2007 in a 2–0 loss over Rizespor coming in as substitute in the 55th minute. He finished his first season for the club with 16 attempts and one assist.

His performances with Kasımpaşa led to interest from several league clubs. On 11 January 2011, Yekta passed his medical and signed for four years with Galatasaray. He made his first appearance for the club one week later against Sivasspor in a 1–00 home win. He also made his first 2013–14 UEFA Champions League appearance on 26 February 2014 against Chelsea, coming in as a substitute in a 1–01 home draw.

Career statistics

Club
.

International

Honours
Galatasaray
Süper Lig (3): 2011–12, 2012–13, 2014–15
Türkiye Kupası (2): 2013–14, 2014–15
Süper Kupa (2): 2012, 2013
Emirates Cup: 2013

References

External links

 
 

1985 births
Footballers from İzmir
Living people
Turkish footballers
Turkey international footballers
Association football midfielders
İzmirspor footballers
Kasımpaşa S.K. footballers
Galatasaray S.K. footballers
Sivasspor footballers
Antalyaspor footballers
Altay S.K. footballers
Süper Lig players
TFF First League players
TFF Second League players